Horaiclavus splendidus is a species of sea snail, a marine gastropod mollusk in the family Horaiclavidae.

It was previously included within the family Turridae.

Description

The length of the shell varies between 15 mm and 40 mm.

The shell is somewhat thin, subpellucid and shining. It shows longitudinal, obtuse, unequal, rather weak plicae, and somewhat distant spiral lineations. It is light brownish, with bands of rather large chestnut maculations. The outer lip is acute, but varicose externally.

Distribution
This marine species occurs off the Philippines, Taiwan and Japan

References

 A. Adams. Description of new species of shells from Japan, Proceedings of the Zoological Society of London, 1867, p. 309, pi. 19, f. 24
 Liu J.Y. [Ruiyu] (ed.). (2008). Checklist of marine biota of China seas. China Science Press. 1267 pp.

External links
  Tucker, J.K. 2004 Catalog of recent and fossil turrids (Mollusca: Gastropoda). Zootaxa 682:1–1295.
 

splendidus
Gastropods described in 1867
Gastropods of Asia